The Bayer designations A Carinae and a Carinae are distinct. Due to technical limitations, both designations link here. For the star

 A Carinae or V415 Carinae
 A Carinae A
 A Carinae B
 a Carinae or V357 Carinae
 a Carinae A
 a Carinae B

See also
 α Carinae

Carinae, A
Carina (constellation)